John Maxwell Aiken (born 3 July 1970) is a New Zealand former cricketer who played for Auckland and Wellington. Born in Sydney, Australia, he was a left-handed batsman who played 46 first class matches and 39 one-day matches in a career spanning 11 seasons from 1989/90 to 2000/01. He scored 2,170 first-class runs at an average of 28.93. During his career, he played for New Zealand XIs against the West Indies, South Africa, Zimbabwe, and Sri Lanka.

At the same time as his cricket career, Aiken trained as a relationship specialist and has run a private practice in New Zealand and Australia. He has also undertaken a range of media work, becoming the dating and relationship expert for the 9Honey television channel, hosting the ABC documentaries Making Couples Happy and Making Families Happy, and most recently becoming one of the experts on the popular Channel 9 reality series Married at First Sight Australia.

References

1970 births
Living people
New Zealand cricketers
Auckland cricketers
Wellington cricketers
Australian psychologists
Australian television personalities